Scarth A.D. 2195 is a British erotic science fiction comic strip created in 1969  by writer Jo Addams and illustrator Luis Roca and originally published in British newspaper The Sun. It was a spin-off from Garth, which was featured in the Daily Mirror. After 1972, its title was changed to Scarth A.D. 2170. Les Lilley is also credited with directing the storylines of Scarth.

References

Adult comic strips
British comic strips
1969 comics debuts
Science fiction comics
Erotic comics
Comics spin-offs
1972 comics endings